Organic geochemistry is the study of the impacts and processes that organisms have had on the Earth. It is mainly concerned with the composition and mode of origin of organic matter in rocks and in bodies of water. The study of organic geochemistry is traced to the work of Alfred E. Treibs, "the father of organic geochemistry." Treibs first isolated metalloporphyrins from petroleum. This discovery established the biological origin of petroleum, which was previously poorly understood. Metalloporphyrins in general are highly stable organic compounds, and the detailed structures of the extracted derivatives made clear that they originated from chlorophyll.

Applications

Energy

Petroleum

The relationship between the occurrence of organic compounds in sedimentary deposits and petroleum deposits has long been of interest. Studies of ancient sediments and rock provide insights into the origins and sources of oil and petroleum, as well as the biochemical antecedents of life. Oil spills in particular have been of interest to geochemists in regards to the impact of petroleum and oil on the current geological environment. Following the Exxon Valdez Oil Spill, organic geochemistry knowledge on oil-spill chemistry bloomed with the analyses of samples from the spill.

Geochemists study petroleum-inclusions in geological samples to compare present-day fluid-inclusions to dated samples. This analysis provides insight into the age of the petroleum samples and the surrounding rock. Spectrographic, optical, destructive, and nondestructive methods are used to analyze samples via mass spectrometry or Raman spectroscopy. The discovered differences in samples, such as oil-to-gas ratio or viscosity are typically attributed to the rock source of the sample. Other characteristics typically noted are pressure/volume/temperature properties, sample texture, and sample composition. Complications in analysis arise when the source rock is near or in a water source.
Petroleum is also studied via carbon isotope analysis. Carbon isotopes provide insight into the Earth's carbon cycle and geological processes. Geochemists are able to discern the composition of petroleum deposits by examining the ratio of carbon isotopes and comparing this ratio to known values for carbon based structures of which the petroleum could be composed.

Coal
Vast knowledge about coal has been attained since the inception of its use as an energy source. However, modern geochemists are still studying how plant material changes into coal. They have determined coalification results from a selective degradation of plant materials, while other plant material is preserved. Coal macromolecules are usually made up of these degradation-resistant biopolymers contained in algae, spores, and wood. Geochemists have unraveled the mysteries behind coal formation by comparing properties of the biopolymers to properties found in existing coal macromolecules. The analytical methods of Carbon NMR and gas chromatography-mass spectrometry (GC-MS) combined with flash pyrolysis has greatly enhanced the ability of organic geochemists to analyse the minute structural units of coal. 

Further knowledge into the age of coal sediments has been attained via isochron dating of uranium in the coalified samples. Examination of the parent to daughter ratio of uranium isotopes has led to the dating of select samples to the Late Cretaceous Period.

Environmental
Modern organic geochemistry includes studies of recent sediments to understand the carbon cycle, climate change, and ocean processes. In connection with petroleum studies, petroleum-focused geochemists also examine the impact of petroleum on the geological environment. Geochemistry also examines other pollutants in geological systems, such as metabolites formed from the degradation of hydrocarbons. Organic geochemistry analytical techniques, such as GC-MS, allow chemists to determine the intricate effects of organic metabolites and human-derived waste products on the geological environment. 
Of specific concern are the human-derived pollutants stemming from agricultural work. The use of animal manure, in combination with general municipal and sewage waste management, has changed many physical properties of the agricultural soil involved and the surrounding soils.

Organic geochemistry is also relevant to aqueous environments. Pollutants, their metabolites, and how both enter bodies of water are of particular importance in the field. This organic matter can also be derived from geological processes in or near bodies of water, similarly influencing nearby lifeforms and protein production. Fluorescence spectroscopy has been introduced as a technique to examine organic matter in bodies of water, as dissolved organic matter is typically fluorescent.

The study of organic geochemistry also extends to the atmosphere. Particularly, geochemists in this field study the makeup of insoluble  material in the lower atmosphere. They have defined certain consequences of organic aerosols including physiological toxicity, direct and indirect climate forcing, smog, rain acidification, and incorporation into the  natural carbon cycle.

Further reading

References

Geochemistry
Geochemistry